Marta Portal Nicolás (10 August 1930 – 26 August 2016) was a Spanish writer, critic, journalist, and professor associated with the Generation of '50. She was a recipient of the Premio Planeta de Novela.

Career
Portal held a degree in philosophy and literature and a PhD in Information Sciences, and taught Hispano-American literature at the Complutense University of Madrid.

As a novelist, she discussed issues of women's education and double standards. In 1966 she was awarded the Premio Planeta for the novel A tientas y a ciegas. Portal received other awards over the course of her career, such as the Premio Adelaida Ristori, Premio Hucha de Plata de cuentos, and Premio de las Letras de Asturias. She was president of the Cultural Association of Hispano-Mexican Friendship. In 2001, the city council of her native town inaugurated the Casa de Cultura Marta Portal in her honor.

Marta Portal died in Madrid on 26 August 2016.

Works

Novels
 A tientas y a ciegas, Barcelona, Editorial Planeta, 1966 (Premio Planeta 1966)
 El malmuerto (1967)
 A ras de las sombras (1968)
 Ladridos a la luna (1970)
 El buen camino (1975)
 Un espacio erótico (1982)
 Pago de traición, Barcelona, Editorial Planeta, 1983
 El ángel caído (1994)
 Él y yo, nosotros tres (2002)

Essays
 El maíz: grano sagrado de América (1970)
 Proceso narrativo de la revolución mexicana (1977)
 Análisis semiológico de Pedro Páramo (1981)
 Rulfo: Dinámica de la violencia (1984)

Short stories
 La veintena (1973)

References

1930 births
2016 deaths
20th-century Spanish novelists
21st-century Spanish novelists
Writers from Asturias
Complutense University of Madrid alumni
Academic staff of the Complutense University of Madrid
People from Oviedo (Asturian comarca)
Spanish journalists
Spanish literary critics
Spanish women literary critics
Spanish women academics
Spanish women essayists
Spanish women journalists
Spanish women novelists
Spanish women short story writers
Spanish short story writers
21st-century Spanish women writers
20th-century Spanish women writers